I Thank You may refer to:

 "I Thank You" (song), a 1968 song by Sam & Dave, covered by ZZ Top
 "I Thank You", a 1969 song by Australian bantamweight boxer Lionel Rose
 "I Thank You", a 1989 song by Adeva
 "I Thank You", a 2003 song by Rebecca St. James
 "I Thank You", a 2013 song by The Tenors
 I Thank You (film), a 1941 film directed by Marcel Varnel
 A catchphrase associated with Arthur Askey who starred in the film

See also
Thank You (disambiguation)